New York International Children's Film Festival (NYICFF) Established in 1997, NYICFF’s mission is rooted in the belief of film as a path for young people to understand themselves and others. All programs are designed to celebrate the beauty and power of film, spark the inherent capacity of children to connect with complex, nuanced art, and encourage the creation of intelligent films that represent and celebrate unique, diverse, and historically excluded voices. NYICFF serves children, students, families, educators, filmmakers, and media arts professionals through its three core activities: the annual, Oscar®-qualifying NYC film festival and national touring program; Film-Ed, a media arts and literacy program; and Toward an Inclusive Future, an annual industry forum.

Annual Festival 
The flagship New York City Festival has grown from one weekend of films into the largest film festival for children and teens in North America. Screened over the course of four weeks at venues throughout NYC, the Festival program – narrowed down from roughly 2,500 international submissions – consists of approximately 100 short and feature films, filmmaker Q&As, retrospective programs, parties, and premieres. Audience members of all ages vote on the Festival-winning films.

Festival Jury 
Winners of the Festival's juried prizes are eligible for Academy consideration in the Best Animated and Best Live Action Short Film categories.

2010 
 Adam Gopnik
 Frances McDormand
 Lynn McVeigh
 Matthew Modine
 Michel Ocelot
 Dana Points
 Susan Sarandon
 James Schamus
 Evan Shapiro
 Uma Thurman
 John Turturro
 Christine Vachon
 Gus Van Sant

2011 
 Adam Gopnik
 Lynn McVeigh
 Matthew Modine
 Michel Ocelot
 Dana Points
 Susan Sarandon
 James Schamus
 Evan Shapiro
 Uma Thurman
 John Turturro
 Christine Vachon
 Gus Van Sant

2012 
 John Canemaker
 Adam Gopnik
 Lynn McVeigh
 Matthew Modine
 Tomm Moore
 Michel Ocelot
 Dana Points
 Susan Sarandon
 James Schamus
 Evan Shapiro
 Uma Thurman
 Christine Vachon
 Gus Van Sant
 Taika Waititi
 Jeffrey Wright

2013 
 John Canemaker
 Geena Davis
 Lynn McVeigh
 Matthew Modine
 Tomm Moore
 Michel Ocelot
 Dana Points
 Susan Sarandon
 James Schamus
 Evan Shapiro
 Christine Vachon
 Gus Van Sant
 Taika Waititi
 Jeffrey Wright

2014 
 John Canemaker
 Geena Davis
 Lynn McVeigh
 Matthew Modine
 Richard Peña
 Bill Plympton
 Dana Points
 Susan Sarandon
 James Schamus
 Henry Selick
 Evan Shapiro
 Uma Thurman
 Christine Vachon
 Gus Van Sant
 Taika Waititi
 Jeffrey Wright

2015 
 John Canemaker
 Geena Davis
 Lynn McVeigh
 Matthew Modine
 Richard Peña
 Bill Plympton
 Dana Points
 Susan Sarandon
 James Schamus
 Henry Selick
 Christine Vachon
 Gus Van Sant
 Taika Waititi
 Jeffrey Wright

2016 
 John Canemaker
 Sofia Coppola
 Geena Davis
 Lynn McVeigh
 Matthew Modine
 Julianna Moore
 Richard Peña
 Bill Plympton
 Dana Points
 Susan Sarandon
 James Schamus
 Christine Vachon
 Gus Van Sant
 Taika Waititi
 Jeffrey Wright

2017 
 John Canemaker
 Sofia Coppola
 Geena Davis
 Lynn McVeigh
 Matthew Modine
 Richard Peña
 Bill Plympton
 Dana Points
 James Schamus
 Uma Thurman
 Christine Vachon
 Gus Van Sant
 Taika Waititi
 Nadine Zylstra
 Jeffrey Wright

2018 
 John Canemaker
 Sofia Coppola
 Geena Davis
 Lynne McVeigh
 Matthew Modine
 Julianne Moore
 Richard Peña
 Bill Plympton
 Dana Points
 Susan Sarandon
 James Schamus
 Christine Vachon
 Gus Van Sant
 Taika Waititi
 Jeffrey Wright

2019 
 John Canemaker
 Melissa Cobb
 Sofia Coppola
 Geena Davis
 Hope Davis
 Madeleine Di Nonno
 Jorge R. Gutiérrez
 Elizabeth Ito
 Kyle MacLachlan
 Lynn McVeigh
 Matthew Modine
 Mark Osborne
 Ira Sachs
 Zoe Saldana
 Uma Thurman
 Nora Twomey
 Taika Waititi
 Jeffrey Wright

References

External links 
 

Children's film festivals in the United States
Film festivals in New York City

